XHDY-TDT is a television station broadcasting from its transmitter in San Cristóbal de las Casas, Chiapas and studios in the state capital of Tuxtla Gutiérrez. XHDY broadcasts on virtual channel 13 (physical channel 36) and is part of the Telsusa regional network.

History
XHDY's concession was awarded on June 19, 1984, to José de Jesús Partida Villanueva, a businessman with connections to Televisa. In 1993, the station's concession was transferred to Comunicación del Sureste.

XHDY maintained a partnership with Televisa and carried programming from its Channel 9 Network and FOROtv, and as a Televisa partner, Comunicación del Sureste is defined as within the "preponderant economic agent" in broadcasting for regulatory purposes. In 2014, XHDY sourced 72 percent of its broadcast day from Televisa. In 2017, simultaneous events prompted XHDY to disaffiliate from Televisa. One was the unwinding of many local relationships as Televisa began to multiplex Gala TV and FOROtv on subchannels of its own TV stations in some areas of the country where said programming had been broadcast on a local station, including Tuxtla Gutiérrez and San Cristóbal de las Casas. Another was the successful participation of Telsusa Televisión México, S.A. de C.V., a company also controlled by Remigio Ángel González, in the IFT-6 television station auction, in which it acquired TV stations in twelve cities primarily in southern and eastern Mexico.

On October 18, 2018, XHDY and its sister stations moved to virtual channel 13.

Programming

XHDY's local program output includes local newscasts, branded as 13 Noticias Chiapas (previously Noticinco), and a morning magazine and talk show, Giros (previously Día Tras Día).

Outside of local programming, XHDY, its Chiapas sister station XHGK, and its Tabasco sister station XHTVL/XHTOE air almost all of the same programming. Weekends are taken up by older Mexican movies.

Repeaters

The primary transmitter for XHDY-TDT is located atop Cerro Pig in San Cristóbal de las Casas. XHDY has a second transmitter atop Cerro Huitepec, another mountain in the same municipality, as Cerro Huitepec blocks reception of the Cerro Pig transmitter in some portions of San Cristóbal. Two additional repeaters provide significant coverage extensions:

References

Television stations in Chiapas
Television channels and stations established in 1984
1984 establishments in Mexico